Bouzoukia may refer to: 

 Bouzouki (pl. bouzoukia), a Greek lute
 Bouzoukia (nightclub), Greek nightclubs that feature laïkó music